The Ministry for the Development of the Periphery, the Negev and the Galilee (HaMisrad LeFitu'ah HaPeriferya, HaNegev VeHaGalil) is a ministry in the Israeli government. Established in January 2005, the current minister is Yitzhak Wasserlauf of Otzma Yehudit.

In the past, there was also a Development Minister. However, this post was succeeded in the 1970s by the Energy and Infrastructure Minister (today the National Infrastructure Minister).

Minister

Deputy ministers

See also
Minister in the Prime Minister's Office

External links
Ministry website 

Development of the Negev and Galilee
Ministry of Development of the Negev and Galilee
Development of the Negev and Galilee
Negev
Galilee